This is a list of all cast members of the TV series Mad TV, which ran for 14 seasons on Fox from 1995 to 2009, then briefly returned for a revival season on The CW in the summer of 2016.

Cast
The list below includes both repertory and featured players, but omits writers and others who were not listed as cast members in the show's credits. The dates given are those of the years they were part of the cast.

See also
 List of Mad TV episodes

Cast timeline

Footnotes

External links

MADTV
MADtv